Yuri Viktorovich Trofimov (born 26 January 1984 in Igra, Udmurt Republic, Soviet Union) is a Russian former road cyclist and mountain biker, who rode professionally between 2008 and 2018 for the  (2008–2010),  (2011–2015),  (2016),  (2017) and  (2018) teams.

In 2015, he finished tenth at the Giro d'Italia, and he won the Russian National Road Race Championships.

Major results

2002
 2nd  Junior cross-country, UCI Mountain Bike & Trials World Championships
 3rd  Junior cross-country, UEC European Mountain Bike Championships
2005
 1st  Under-23 cross-country, UCI Mountain Bike & Trials World Championships
 1st  Cross-country, National Under-23 Mountain Bike Championships
 1st Mountains classification Circuit des Ardennes
 3rd  Under-23 cross-country, UEC European Mountain Bike Championships
 3rd Road race, National Under-23 Road Championships
 3rd Overall Tour de Serbie
 3rd Tour du Finistère
 5th Memorial Oleg Dyachenko
2006
 1st Paris–Troyes
 2nd Overall Tour de Serbie
 2nd Grand Prix of Moscow
 3rd Overall Grand Prix of Sochi
 5th Tour du Finistère
 7th Overall Circuit des Ardennes
 7th Overall Five Rings of Moscow
2007
 1st La Roue Tourangelle
 1st Paris–Troyes
 1st Stage 1 Les 3 Jours de Vaucluse
 2nd Classic Loire Atlantique
 3rd Road race, National Road Championships
 6th Route Adélie
 7th Grand Prix de la ville de Nogent-sur-Oise
2008
 1st  Overall Étoile de Bessèges
1st Stage 3
 1st Stage 5 Critérium du Dauphiné Libéré
 8th Grand Prix d'Ouverture La Marseillaise
2009
 1st Stage 2 Tour of the Basque Country
 2nd Road race, National Road Championships
 3rd Overall Étoile de Bessèges
 3rd Grand Prix d'Ouverture La Marseillaise
 9th Overall Paris–Nice
2010
 10th Overall Tour du Haut Var
 10th Overall Route du Sud
2011
 3rd Road race, National Road Championships
2013
 6th Gran Premio Industria e Commercio di Prato
2014
 1st Stage 4 Critérium du Dauphiné
 5th GP Miguel Induráin
 8th Overall Tour of the Basque Country
2015
 1st  Road race, National Road Championships
 5th International Road Cycling Challenge
 10th Overall Giro d'Italia
2017
 1st  Overall Five Rings of Moscow
1st Stage 1

Grand Tour general classification results timeline

References

External links

Palmares on Cycling Base (French)

1984 births
Living people
People from Udmurtia
Russian male cyclists
Cyclists at the 2004 Summer Olympics
Cyclists at the 2008 Summer Olympics
Olympic cyclists of Russia
European Games competitors for Russia
Cyclists at the 2015 European Games
Sportspeople from Udmurtia